Peder Smedvig (1882–1959) was a Norwegian businessman, the founder of Smedvig ASA.

Career
In 1915, Smedvig started a shipping company. In 1935, he started Smedvig Tankrederi, but in World War II, four out of the five ships were lost.

Personal life
After he died in 1959, his son Torolf Smedvig took over the running of the company and the canned food business became a separate company run by another branch of the family.

References

1882 births
1959 deaths
Norwegian businesspeople in shipping
Smedvig family